Maria Rentoumi (born 9 December 1981) is a Greek fencer. She competed in the women's individual foil event at the 2004 Summer Olympics.

References

External links
 

1981 births
Living people
Greek female foil fencers
Olympic fencers of Greece
Fencers at the 2004 Summer Olympics
Mediterranean Games bronze medalists for Greece
Mediterranean Games medalists in fencing
Competitors at the 2001 Mediterranean Games